Hadameh or Haddameh may refer to:
 Hadameh-ye Olya
 Hadameh-ye Vosta